Ha Sung-woon (born March 22, 1994), also known mononymously as Sungwoon, is a South Korean singer and songwriter. He is best known as a member of South Korean boy group Wanna One, as a member of boy group Hotshot, and currently as a solo artist. In 2019, he began his solo music career with his first extended play My Moment.

Career

Prior to 2017
Ha joined Star Crew Entertainment (formerly known as Ardor&Able) and debuted with Hotshot as main vocalist on October 29, 2014, with a digital single "Take a Shot".

2017–2018: Produce 101 and Wanna One

Ha and Roh Tae-hyun represented Ardor&Able Entertainment in the boy group reality survival show, Produce 101 Season 2 which aired on Mnet from April 7 until June 16, 2017. In the final concert that took place on July 1 and 2, 2017, at Olympic Hall in Seoul, Ha managed to gain 790,302 votes and was announced as the final member of the project boy group Wanna One under YMC Entertainment.

Ha debuted with Wanna One during Wanna One Premier Show-Con on August 7, 2017, at the Gocheok Sky Dome with a mini-album 1×1=1 (To Be One). He was also in the sub-group Lean on Me with Hwang Min-hyun and Yoon Ji-sung, performing the song "Forever and a Day" produced by Nell. The subunit was announced on the first day of Wanna One Go: X-Con, and the song was included on Wanna One's album 1÷x=1 (Undivided).

During his time with Wanna One, Ha was invited to join several TV programs, such as the eighth episode of SBS variety show Master Key, Law of the Jungle Sabah, which aired from July 27 to September 21, 2018, and MBC singing competition program King of Masked Singer, in which he got to the third round with his rendition of "Smile Again" by Rumble fish, "Drifting Apart" by Nell, and "Appearance" by Kim Bum-soo.

His contract with Wanna One ended on December 31, 2018, but he still appeared with the group until their final concerts (titled "Therefore") held across four days, ending on January 27, 2019, at the Gocheok Sky Dome in Seoul, where the group held their debut showcase.

2019: Graduation, solo debut, and solo activities
On January 28, Ha unveiled his self-composed song "Don't Forget" featuring former Wanna One member Park Ji-hoon. "Don't Forget" was released as a pre-release track from his EP My Moment, with lyrics about wishing to cherish memories with loved ones.

The singer began his solo activity by announcing his first two-day fan-meeting, "My Moment", which was held from March 8–9 at the SK Olympic Handball Gymnasium in Olympic Park, Seoul. The tickets went on sale on February 20 and sold out within two minutes of the pre-order becoming available. He was also scheduled to meet fans in six Asian cities including Tokyo on March 17, Osaka on the March 19, Taipei on March 23, Bangkok on March 30, Hong Kong on April 5, Macao on June 8, and Jakarta on June 22. While preparing for his solo debut, Ha showed his bright side in the interview and pictorial with The Star Magazine. He also did a photoshoot with Allure magazine, where he mentioned the EP. In between his schedule, the singer attended his graduation ceremony at the Dong-ah Institute of Media and Arts on February 22, 2019.

My Moment was released on February 28, 2019, featuring the upbeat lead single "Bird". The singer held a showcase at Live Hall in Gwangjin-gu, Seoul on February 27. The album consists of five tracks, which were all written and composed by Ha himself. He also served as the executive producer and participated in the production process, such as mixing and mastering. Hanteo reported that 45,600 copies of the album were sold on the first day of release, making My Moment the third-highest first-day sales for an album. It also became the first number one on the Gaon retail album chart, which began on March 4. My Moment topped the ninth week (February 24 – March 2) of the main Gaon Album Chart, and ranked first on the daily charts of February 28, March 2, and March 3. On March 1, Ha performed the songs "Bird" and "Tell Me I Love You" at One K Concert—a three-day music and art festival—at the Yeouido Parliament House grass field, which was held to commemorate the hundredth anniversary of the March 1 Movement and aims to spread the hopes of the reunification of the Korean Peninsula and peace in Northeast Asia and the world.

He was also appointed as a guest MC for SBS Inkigayo on March 2 and on March 13, Ha took the trophy on his first solo with the song "Bird" on Show Champion Ha sang the Korean national anthem at the 17th KTMF 2019 (the annual K Pop Festival which was held by the Korea Daily) and also perform three songs ("Bird", "Tell Me I Love You", and "Magic Castle") in front of more than twenty thousands spectators at the Hollywood Bowl - Los Angeles.

Beside his vocal and dance skills, Ha  demonstrated his ability as a DJ in the MBC Radio program 'Idol Radio' on April 18, with JBJ95 as a guest. He also participated in several donation programs and projects. He became MC together with Kim Hee-ae, and former Wanna One member Lee Dae-hwi for MBC '2019 New Life for Children' on May 5 at Sangam MBC public hall, which has been held 29 times since the beginning of 1990. It is the best domestic donation program which aims to delivers hope to children suffering from diseases such as rare and incurable diseases Ha's fans hoped to convey their loves for children by donating KRW 27 million or US$27733 and became the highest donator during the event

In addition to his music related promotion and activities, Ha also donated his voice in EBS literature program 'Linking Hearts through the Voices of Idol Stars', the first project to combine idol readings and donations which aims to raise interest in Korean literature and create a new reading culture through the public readings. Hawas the second idol invited to join this special project after Chungha. He recited a novel written by Jun Sun-ok, "Ramen is cool" (라면은멋있다) and expressed his gratitude to be able to participate in such a meaningful project.

On May 12, Ha became a cast in SBS pilot program Bistro the noble (격조식당), a food variety program that sets the ultimate food with the finest ingredients which are produced by famous people from all over the country. He also became a line up in several concerts and festivals, such as: KCON 2019 Japan, Dream Concert 2019 which was held at the Seoul World Cup Stadium on May 18 (to promote 'dreams and hopes' to Korean youth), and the 13th Seoul Jazz Festival which was held at the SK Olympic Handball Gymnasium May 26.

Ha has sung several OSTs, including "Think of You" for tvN drama Her Private Life, "Immunity" for JTBC drama The wind blows, and "Because of You" for JTBC drama Flower Crew.

On June 5, Ha unveiled his self-composed song "Riding" featuring Dynamic Duo Gaeko, a pre-release track his second EP, BXXX, which was later released on July 8. The EP featured the medium tempo lead single "Blue" which shows a dramatic change in the song with an explosive vocal. The album consists of five tracks, of which four were written and composed by Ha. "Blue" was composed by Joombas (Hyuk Shin, KYUM LYK, and JJ Evans), while Ha gave his contribution as the lyricist. Hanteo reported that 66,056 copies of the album were sold on the first week of release.

Ha  held his very first solo concert 'Dive in Color' in Seoul's Jamsil Indoor Stadium, one of the five biggest concert halls in Korea, from July 26 to 27. The pre-sale tickets were sold out shortly after it opened. He also held his concert at Busan BEXCO 1st Exhibition Hall on August 3, and in Tokyo, Japan, from September 12 to 13. On October 5, Sungwoon partnered up with renowned producer and composer Yoon Sang and released a collaboration single "Dream of a Dream" as part of the Fever Festival. Since early November, he consistently ranks 1st in the top 10 most popular entertainer in non-drama TV field, for his variety show skill in SkyDrama - 'We Play'.

2020: OST release, Twilight Zone, Mirage, and other activities
UNICEF Korea Committee launched the campaign 'Safe Water, Save Lives!' from March 19 to 31 to support drinking water for children in developing countries. The campaign period coincides with World Water Day which also falls on the same day as Ha's birthday, March 22.
Ha actively sympathizes with the preciousness of water, and participated in the campaign video as a talent donation, appealing for warm interest and support for children suffering from contaminated drinking water. Lee Ki-chul, secretary-general of UNICEF's Korean Committee said, "I heard that Ha's name was made up of water and cloud. Ha Sung-woon, who has a special relationship with water in his birthday and his name, joined together to create a more special campaign. We ask that more people join us in this campaign to protect children's lives with clean water." The funds raised through the 'Safe Water, Save Lives!'  campaign will be used to support drinking water purifiers, oral hydration supplements and hand pumps for children suffering from contaminated water.

On April 30, it was announced that Ha would be releasing an OST for the drama The King: Eternal Monarch  titled "I Fall In Love" on May 2.

Ha released his third EP, Twilight Zone, on June 8, featuring the lead single "Get Ready".

For the second year now, Benefit Cosmetics Korea has announced that Ha will be the product endorser for its Love & Summer campaign dedicated for its range of Lip Tint products following the success of the first HaSungWoon x Benefit campaign in 2019. Continuing his summer activities, Ha participated in an online donation concert by MBC TV and World Vision to comfort people suffering from Coronavirus disease 2019. More recently, Ha performed in the 26th Dream Concert, one of the most anticipated concerts in Korea via livestream broadcast.

On July 28, Ha was featured in Ravi's Summer EP with the title track "Paradise".

Ha released his fourth EP, Mirage on November 9, featuring the lead single "Forbidden Island".

2021: Sneakers, Select Shop, Electrified: Urban Nostalgia, and new agency 
Ha released his fifth EP, Sneakers on June 7, featuring the lead single of the same name.  The repackaged version of his fifth EP, Select Shop was released on August 9, featuring the lead single "Strawberry Gum", featuring Don Mills.

On November 2, it was reported that Ha had ended his contract with Star Crew Entertainment starting from October 31 and he decided not to renew it.

Ha released his sixth EP, Electrified: Urban Nostalgia on November 19, as his last release under Star Crew Entertainment, featuring the lead single "Electrified".

On December 24, Ha signed a contract with BPM Entertainment.

2022: You and Strange World
On February 9, Ha released his special album, You,  featuring the lead single "Can't Live Without You".

On April 14, Ha released the promotional single "La La Pop!" through Universe Music for the mobile application, Universe.

On August 24, Ha released his seventh mini-album Strange World. Ha also performed at the 'Welcome to Strange World' concert on August 27 and 28.

Personal life

Military service 
Ha enlisted in mandatory military service on September 5, 2022, without revealing his location and time to prevent the spread of COVID-19.On September 2, 2022, Ha was confirmed to have contracted COVID-19, causing him to postpone his military service. His agency will announce the new military service schedule at a later date.

On October 7, 2022, it was announced that Ha would be serving his mandatory military service on October 24, without revealing his location and time to prevent the spread of COVID-19.

Discography

Extended plays

Reissues

Singles

Other charted songs

Soundtrack appearances

Other releases and collaborations

Filmography

Television and Radio shows

Theater

Songwriting and composing

Awards and nominations

Notes

References

1994 births
Living people
People from Goyang
Produce 101 contestants
Swing Entertainment artists
BPM Entertainment artists
South Korean television personalities
South Korean male idols
South Korean pop singers
South Korean singer-songwriters
South Korean dance musicians
21st-century South Korean singers
K-pop singers
Wanna One members
Reality show winners